Elections to Knowsley Metropolitan Borough Council were held on 3 May 2007.  One third of the council was up for election and the Labour Party kept overall control of the council.

After the election, the composition of the council was:
Labour 50
Liberal Democrat 13

Election result

5 Labour candidates were uncontested.

Ward results

External links
Knowsley borough elections 2007

2007
2007 English local elections
2000s in Merseyside